Ernestia is a genus of plant in family Melastomataceae.

Its native range is tropical South America and it is found in the countries of Brazil (north), Colombia, French Guiana, Guyana, Peru, Suriname and Venezuela.

The genus name of Ernestia is in honour of Ernst Heinrich Friedrich Meyer (1791–1858), a German botanist and botanical historian, it was first described and published by Augustin-Pyramus de Candolle in Prodr. Vol.3 on page 121 in 1828.

Known species
According to Kew;

References

Melastomataceae
Melastomataceae genera
Plants described in 1828
Flora of South America